Pat Raftery may refer to:

 Pat Raftery (footballer) (1925–1998), English former footballer
 Pat Raftery (camogie), former camogie player